James Michael White (born August 11, 1957) is an American college football coach and former professional player. He served as head football coach at Albany State University (ASU) in Albany, Georgia from 2000 to 2014 and Benedict College in Columbia, South Carolina from 2015 to 2019. White played college football as a defensive tackle at Albany State during the late 1970s, and later was drafted by the Cincinnati Bengals in the fourth round of the 1979 NFL Draft. He also played for the Seattle Seahawks.

Coaching career
After his playing career ended, White joined the coaching staff at his alma mater in 1984 as the defensive line coach, and was promoted to defensive coordinator in 1989. In 1997, White became the assistant head coach, and in 2000, was named head coach of the Albany State Golden Rams. He continued to  serve as the defensive coordinator while he was head coach. His 2010 Albany State team was named SBN Black College National Champions.

On December 18, 2014, White was named head football coach at Benedict College in Columbia, South Carolina.

Head coaching record

References

External links
 Benedict profile
 Albany State profile
 

1957 births
Living people
American football defensive tackles
Albany State Golden Rams football coaches
Albany State Golden Rams football players
Benedict Tigers football coaches
Cincinnati Bengals players
Seattle Seahawks players
Coaches of American football from Georgia (U.S. state)
Players of American football from Augusta, Georgia
African-American coaches of American football
African-American players of American football
20th-century African-American sportspeople
21st-century African-American sportspeople